Hitz is an American sitcom that aired on UPN from August 26 until November 11, 1997. The series follows two record industry executives (Rick Gomez and Claude Brooks) and their boss (Andrew Dice Clay) at Hitower Records in Los Angeles.

Cast
Andrew Dice Clay as HiTower president Jimmy Esposito
Rick Gomez as Robert Moore
Claude Brooks as Busby Evans
Rosa Blasi as April Beane
Kristin Dattilo as Angela
Spencer Garrett as Tommy Stans

Episodes

Production
Although UPN had initially ordered 13 episodes, by October the network had ordered nine more episodes for a total of 22. However, by December the series was canceled before production on the last six episodes was complete.

Reception
Caryn James of The New York Times called the series "relentlessly unfunny". Ken Tucker of Entertainment Weekly rated the series as one of the worst of the year.

References

External links

1990s American sitcoms
1997 American television series debuts
1997 American television series endings
English-language television shows
Television series by CBS Studios
Television shows set in Los Angeles
UPN original programming

Works about the music industry